The De-No-To Cultural District, also known as the Trinity Summit Area is a Hupa cultural site near Hoopa, California. The area serves as a religious site for the Hupa, and the people still conduct religious ceremonies at sites in the district. Studies of the area have found rock circles with scenic views, hearths used for various ceremonial purposes, and cairns. Trails and resting points in the district were also used for religious purposes. In addition to its religious function, the area has been used for grazing livestock.

The district was added to the National Register of Historic Places on April 24, 1985.

References

Further reading
Winter, Joseph C., et al. DE-NO-TO: A Study of Hupa Indian Use of the Trinity Summit Area. U.S. Forest Service.

Properties of religious function on the National Register of Historic Places in California
Hupa
Native Americans in Trinity County, California
Native Americans in Humboldt County, California
National Register of Historic Places in Trinity County, California
Historic districts on the National Register of Historic Places in California